Zoé, Lady Laurier ( Lafontaine; June 26, 1841 – November 1, 1921), was the wife of Sir Wilfrid Laurier, the seventh Prime Minister of Canada.

Biography

Zoé Lafontaine was born on 27 June 1841 to Godefroy-Napoleon Robert and Zoé Tessier dite Lavigne in Montreal. She was baptized on 28 June at the Notre-Dame Basilica.

In Montreal, Lafontaine was educated at the School of the Bon Pasteur, and at the Convent of the Sisters of the Sacred Heart, St. Vincent de Paul. She served as one of the vice presidents on the formation of the National Council of Women of Canada and was honorary vice president of the Victorian Order of Nurses.

In 1861, Lafontaine first met her future husband, Sir Wilfrid Laurier, at the home of Dr. Séraphin Gauthier, where both were boarding. During this time she was a piano teacher to Gauthier's children.

On May 13, 1868, the two were married in the Saint-Jacques Cathedral. The couple lived at Arthabaskaville until they moved to Ottawa in 1896. Ultimately, their union was childless, to Laurier's dismay.

Lafontaine served as one of the vice presidents on the formation of the National Council of Women and was honorary vice president of the Victorian Order of Nurses.

On 17 February 1919, Laurier died. Lafontaine outlived her husband by more than two years. She died in Ottawa on November 1, 1921, at the age of 80.

Her will bequeathed her Ottawa home to William Lyon Mackenzie King.

Legacy

Graham-Laurier Provincial Park, in British Columbia, has a lake named 'Lady Laurier Lake' and a mountain named 'Lady Laurier Mountain', which is the highest peak in the park.
In 1985, a lounge in the Château Laurier was named in her honour. The lounge overlooks Rideau Street.
, a Canadian Coast Guard ship was christened after her. The ship operated between 1902 and 1960.
DuVillage, a specialty cheesemaker, has a soft cheese called "Lady Laurier d'Arthabaska".

See also
 Spouse of the prime minister of Canada

Notes

References

External links

A Love Letter From W. Laurier
Zoé's Lounge at the Château Laurier

1841 births
1921 deaths
Spouses of prime ministers of Canada
Canadian socialites
Wilfrid Laurier
Wives of knights